The 12975 / 12976 Jaipur–Mysore Superfast Express is Superfast Express train belonging to Indian Railways that runs between  and  in India.

It operates as train number 12976 from Jaipur Junction to Mysore Junction and as train number 12975 in the reverse direction.

Coaches

12975/12976 Jaipur–Mysore Superfast Express presently has 1 AC 1st Class cum AC 2 tier, 2 AC 2 tier, 5 AC 3 tier, 11 Sleeper class, 4 General Unreserved coaches & 1 Pantry Car coach.

As with most train services in India, coach composition may be amended at the discretion of Indian Railways depending on demand.

Service

12976  Jaipur–Mysore Superfast Express covers the distance of 2479 kilometres in 44 hours 00 mins (56.34 km/hr) & in 44 hours 55 mins (55.19 km/hr) as 12975 Mysore–Jaipur Superfast Express.

As the average speed of the train is above 55 km/hr, as per Indian Railways rules, its fare includes a Superfast surcharge.

Direction reversal
The train reverses its direction 3 times during its journey at; 
 
 Nagda Junction  
 Guntakal Junction.

Routing

Rake sharing
The train shares its rake with 19713/19714 Jaipur–Secunderabad Express.

Gallery

Traction

It is hauled by 4 locomotives during its run. A Bhagat Ki Kothi-based WDP-4 / WDP-4B / WDP-4D locomotive hauls the train between Jaipur Junction &  after which a Lallaguda-based WAP-7 locomotive takes over until  handing over to Krishnarajapuram based WDP-4D locomotive till  and from Guntakal Junction, a Vijayawada-based WAP-4 locomotive takes over the remaining journey up to Mysore Junction

Time Table

 12976 Jaipur–Mysore Superfast Express leaves Jaipur Junction every Monday & Wednesday at 19:35 hrs IST and reaches Mysore Junction at 16:20 hrs IST on the 3rd day.
 12975 Mysore–Jaipur Superfast Express leaves Mysore Junction every Thursday & Saturday at 10:15 hrs IST and reaches Jaipur Junction at 06:15 hrs IST on the 3rd day.

External links

References 

Transport in Jaipur
Transport in Mysore
Express trains in India
Rail transport in Rajasthan
Rail transport in Madhya Pradesh
Rail transport in Maharashtra
Rail transport in Andhra Pradesh
Rail transport in Karnataka